Trosky may refer to:

Trosky Castle, Semily, Liberec Region, Czech Republic
Rovensko pod Troskami
Trosky, Minnesota, United States

People with the surname
Hal Trosky (1912–1979), baseball player
Hal Trosky, Jr. (born 1936), Major League Baseball pitcher
Jon Trosky (born 1980), American actor

See also 
Leon Trotsky (1879–1940), Soviet politician and Marxist theorist